Tall Korehi-ye Bon Rud (also Romanized as Tall Korehī-ye Bon Rūd; also known as Tall Koreh) is a village in Dasht-e Arzhan Rural District, Arzhan District, Shiraz County, Fars Province, Iran. At the 2006 census, its population was 40, in 9 families.

References 

Populated places in Shiraz County